Yeh Mera Deewanapan Hai is a Pakistani television series aired on A-Plus TV, written by Zanjabeel Asim Shah and produced by Sadia Jabbar. It stars Saima Noor and Junaid Khan in lead roles. The series which is set in Karachi, Pakistan and spans over 30 years, starts from 1990s to present day. It revolves around Jehangir who falls for Mehtab, a lady much older than her.

Plot summary 

Since his childhood, Jehangir is attracted towards Mehtaab, a divorced nurse in his father's clinic. With the passage of time, his feelings develops deeper and he falls for her due to her beauty as his father also has an affair with another woman because he consider his mother as unattractive. The plot revolves around the love story of Jehangir and the troubles faced by his family.

Cast 
 Saima Noor as Mehtab 
 Junaid Khan as Jehangir, Nafeesuddin and Attiya's only son
 Javed Sheikh as Dr. Nafeesuddin, Jehangir's father
 Irsa Ghazal as Attiya, Jehangir's mother
 Saima Qureshi as Rakshanda, Mina and Zeba's mother
 Rashid Farooqui as Siddiqui
 Jinaan Hussain as Zeba, Rakshanda's elder daughter
 Anoushey Abbasi as Mina, Rakshanda's younger daughter
 Tabbasum Arif as Nighat, Nafeesuddin's cousin
 Anita Camphor as Tabinda, Nafeesuddin's elder sister

References 

2015 Pakistani television series debuts
Pakistani drama television series
Urdu-language television shows